The International Car of the Year (ICOTY) awards are one of several annual "car of the year" awards around the world for new automobile models judged to be the best of their generation. This one is presented by the United States magazine Road & Travel Magazine. Awards are given under ten different categories to new vehicles manufactured internationally and available on the US market.  The awards ceremony is attended by 600 industry leaders and media on the evening before Press Days at the North American International Auto Show (NAIAS). The awards have been presented annually since 1997.

2015 Winners
Car of the year:Kia K900

2014 Winners
Car of the year:Kia Cadenza
Truck of Year:Ford Ranger
Earth, Wind & Power Car of the Year:Toyota Corolla
Earth, Wind & Power Truck of the Year:Audi Q5

2013 Winners 
Car of the year:Kia Optima
Truck of Year:Ford Ranger
Earth, Wind & Power Car of the Year:Dodge Dart
Earth, Wind & Power Truck of the Year:Volvo XC60

2012 Winners 
Car of the year:Audi A7
Truck of Year:Range Rover Evoque
Sedan: Toyota Camry
Sporty Coupe:Hyundai Veloster
Sports Car:Porsche 911
Compact: Ford Focus
Minivan: Honda Odyssey
EWP Car of Year:Volkswagen Passat TDI

2011 Winners 
Car of the Year: Hyundai Sonata
Truck of the Year: Kia Sportage
SUV of the Year: Ford Explorer
Sedan of the Year: Volvo S60
Luxury Car: Jaguar XJ

2010 Winners 
Car of the Year: Ford Taurus
Truck of the Year: Volvo XC60

2009 Winners 
Car of the Year: Nissan GT-R
Truck of the Year:Dodge Ram 1500
Environmentally friendly Car: Volkswagen Jetta TDI
Environmentally friendly Truck: Ford Escape Hybrid

2008 Winners 
Car of the Year: Honda Accord sedan
Truck of the Year: Dodge Ram 2500
SUV of the Year: Chevrolet Tahoe Hybrid
Sedan of the Year: Honda Accord
Luxury Car: Mercedes-Benz C63 AMG
Most Respected: Mercedes-Benz C63 AMG
Pickup Truck of the Year: GMC SierraDenali
Crossover: Buick Enclave
Sports car of the Year: Audi R8
Minivan of the Year: Chrysler Town & Country
Entry-level: Volvo C30

2007 Winners 
Car of the Year: Lexus LS 460
Truck of the Year: Chevrolet Silverado
SUV of the Year: GMC Yukon
Sedan of the Year: Toyota Camry
Luxury Car: Lexus LS 460
Most Respected: Lexus LS 460
Pickup Truck of the Year: Chevrolet Silverado
Crossover: Mazda CX-7
Sports car of the Year: Jaguar XK
Minivan of the Year: Ford Freestar
Entry-level: Mazdaspeed3

2006 Winners 
Car of the Year: Dodge Charger
Truck of the Year:  Hummer H3
Pickup of the Year – “Most Athletic”:  Honda Ridgeline
Sports Car of the Year – “Most Sex Appeal”: Pontiac Solstice
Sedan of the Year – “Most Dependable”: Honda Accord 
Luxury Car of the Year – “Most Respected”:  Mercedes-Benz CLS500
Minivan of the Year – “Most Compatible”:  Honda Odyssey
Entry-Level Car of the Year – “Most Spirited”: Audi A3
Crossover of the Year – “Most Versatile”: BMW M3
SUV of the Year – “Most Resourceful”: 
Ford Explorer (tie)
Land Rover Range Rover Sport (tie)

2005 Winners 
Car of the Year: Honda Civic EX 
Truck of the Year: Hummer H2 SUT 
Most Sex Appeal/Sports Car: Chevy Corvette
Most Dependable/Sedan: Subaru Legacy 2.5i 
Most Spirited/Entry-Level: MINI Cooper Convertible
Most Compatible/Minivan: Chrysler Town & Country 
Most Versatile/Crossover: Dodge Magnum
Most Respected/Luxury Car: Jaguar XJ LWB
Most Athletic/Pickup Truck: Ford F-250 SuperDuty
Most Resourceful/SUV: Land Rover LR3

Most wins

Notes

See also
 Car of the Year (disambiguation page)
 World Car of the Year
 North American Car of the Year
 European Car of the Year
 Canadian Car of the Year
 International Engine of the Year
 List of motor vehicle awards

References 
 http://autoshow.msn.com/as/article.aspx?xml=icoty&shw=autoshow2006
 
 https://web.archive.org/web/20070110090149/http://journals.aol.com/cciccone05/GearShift/entries/2007/01/07/international-car-of-the-year-awards-2007/1251
 http://www.edmunds.com/advice/buying/articles/119092/article.html

External links 
 http://www.roadandtravel.com/awards/awardspast/winnerspast.htm

Motor vehicle awards